Malus honanensis is a wild species in the genus Malus (mostly referred for the crabapple or wild apple), in the family Rosaceae, with no established common name, and used as rootstock for the domesticated apple.

References

Genetic clues to the origin of the apple

honanensis
Crabapples